The Liga Independente das Escolas de Samba de  São Paulo - Independent League of the Samba Schools of São Paulo - or LigaSP is an entity that administrates the Special and  Access Groups of the Carnival of São Paulo.

In 1986 directors of the principal samba schools of São Paulo and a group of samba composers and dancers gathered in an assembly decided to create an association that would administrate the Paulista carnival.

Nowadays the LigaSP manages the parades, repassing the lucres to the samba schools of the Special and Access Groups, creating a group of sporting samba schools. in 2018 changes take control of all the groups in Anhembi , with the inclusion of Group 1, until then UESP. so we have the Access Groups 1 and 2.

Presidents

Grupo Especial 
 Friday

 Acadêmicos do Tucuruvi
 Colorado do Brás
 Mancha Verde
 Tom Maior
 Unidos de Vila Maria
 Acadêmicos do Tatuapé
 Dragões da Real

 Saturday

 Vai-Vai
 Gaviões da Fiel
 Mocidade Alegre
 Águia de Ouro
 Barroca Zona Sul
 Rosas de Ouro
 Império de Casa Verde

Grupo 1 
 Sunday

 Morro da Casa Verde
 Camisa Verde e Branco
 Mocidade Unida da Mooca
 Independente Tricolor
 Estrela do Terceiro Milênio
 X-9 Paulistana
 Leandro de Itaquera
 Pérola Negra

Grupo 2 
 Monday

 Brinco da Marquesa
 Camisa 12
 Uirapuru da Mooca
 Primeira da Cidade Líder
 Unidos de Santa Bárbara
 Torcida Jovem
 Nenê de Vila Matilde
 Unidos do Peruche
 Imperador do Ipiranga
 Amizade Zona Leste
 Tradição Albertinense
 Dom Bosco

First Division Champions 
 1950 - Lavapés (1)
 1951 - Lavapés (2)
 1952 - Lavapés (3)
 1953 - Lavapés (4)
 1954 - Brasil de Santos (1)    
 1955 - Garotos do Itaim (1)
 1956 - Nenê de Vila Matilde (1)
 1956 - Lavapés (5)
 1956 - Garotos do Itaim (2)
 1957 - Unidos do Peruche (1)
 1958 - Nenê de Vila Matilde (2)
 1959 - Nenê de Vila Matilde (3)
 1960 - Nenê de Vila Matilde (4)
 1961 - Lavapés (6)
 1962 - Unidos do Peruche (2)
 1963 - Nenê de Vila Matilde (5)
 1964 - Lavapés (7)
 1965 - Nenê de Vila Matilde (6)
 1965 - Unidos do Peruche (3)
 1966 - Unidos do Peruche (4)   
 1967 - Unidos do Peruche (5)
 1968 - Nenê de Vila Matilde (7)
 1969 - Nenê de Vila Matilde (8)
 1970 - Nenê de Vila Matilde (9)
 1971 - Mocidade Alegre (1)
 1972 - Mocidade Alegre (2)
 1973 - Mocidade Alegre (3)
 1974 - Camisa Verde e Branco (1)
 1975 - Camisa Verde e Branco (2)
 1976 - Camisa Verde e Branco (3)
 1977 - Camisa Verde e Branco (4)
 1978 - Vai-Vai (1)
 1979 - Camisa Verde e Branco (5)  
 1980 - Mocidade Alegre (4)
 1981 - Vai-Vai (2)
 1982 - Vai-Vai (3)
 1983 - Rosas de Ouro (1)
 1984 - Rosas de Ouro (2)
 1985 - Nenê de Vila Matilde (10)
 1986 - Vai-Vai (5)
 1987 - Vai-Vai (6)
 1989 - Camisa Verde e Branco (6)
 1990 - Camisa Verde e Branco (7)
 1990 - Rosas de Ouro (2)
 1990 - Camisa Verde e Branco (7)
 1990 - Rosas de Ouro (3)
 1991 - Camisa Verde e Branco (8)
 1991 - Rosas de Ouro (4)
 1992 - Rosas de Ouro (5)
 1993 - Camisa Verde e Branco (9)
 1993 - Vai-Vai (7)
 1994 - Rosas de Ouro (6)
 1995 - Gaviões da Fiel (1)
 1996 - Vai-Vai (8)  
 1997 - X-9 Paulistana (1)
 1998 - Vai-Vai (9)
 1999 - Gaviões da Fiel (2)
 1999 - Vai-Vai (10)
 2000 - Vai-Vai (11)
 2000 - X-9 Paulistana (2)
 2001 - Vai-Vai (12)
 2001 - Nenê de Vila Matilde (11)
 2002 - Gaviões da Fiel (3)
 2003 - Gaviões da Fiel (4)
 2004 - Mocidade Alegre (5)
 2005 - Império de Casa Verde (1)
 2006 - Império de Casa Verde (2)
 2007 - Mocidade Alegre (6)
 2008 - Vai-Vai (13)
 2009 - Mocidade Alegre (7)
 2010 - Rosas de Ouro (7)
 2011 - Vai-Vai (14)
 2012 - Mocidade Alegre (8)
 2013 - Mocidade Alegre (9)
 2014 - Mocidade Alegre (10)
 2015 - Vai-Vai (15)
 2016 - Império de Casa Verde (3)
 2017 - Acadêmicos do Tatuapé (1)
 2018 - Acadêmicos do Tatuapé (2)
 2019 - Mancha Verde (1)
 2020 - Águia de Ouro (1)

See also 
Anhembi Sambadrome
Torcida Jovem of Santos FC School of Samba

References

External links 
 Official website of the Liga Independente das Escolas de Samba de  São Paulo
 Official website Torcida Jovem of Santos FC School of Samba

São Paulo Carnival